The Cambridge Hills are a mountain range in Lyon County, Nevada.

References 

Mountain ranges of Nevada
Mountain ranges of the Great Basin
Mountain ranges of Lyon County, Nevada